Tytler is a surname of Scottish origin. Notable people with the surname include:

 Alexander Fraser Tytler, Lord Woodhouselee (1747–1813), Scottish lawyer and writer
 Harry Christopher Tytler (1868–1938), British soldier and entomologist
 Jagdish Tytler (born 1944), Indian politician
 James Tytler (born 1745), Scottish aeronaut
 J. D. Tytler (James Douglas Tytler) (1902-1973), Scottish-born Indian educationist
 Patrick Fraser Tytler (1791–1849), Scottish historian
 Robert Christopher Tytler (1818–1872), British soldier, naturalist and photographer

References

Surnames of Scottish origin